Narayangarh may refer to:

 Narayangarh, Chitwan, a city in Nepal
 Naraingarh or Narayangarh, a city in Haryana, India
 Naraingarh (Vidhan Sabha constituency)
 Narayangarh, Mandsaur, a town in Madhya Pradesh, India
 Narayangarh, Paschim Medinipur, a village in Paschim Medinipur, West Bengal, India
 Narayangarh railway station
 Narayangarh (community development block), a division in Paschim Medinipur district in West Bengal, India
 Narayangarh (Vidhan Sabha constituency), an assembly constituency in West Bengal, India